Jane Resh Thomas (born August 15, 1936) is an American children's writer.

Jane Resh Thomas was born on August 15, 1936, in Kalamazoo, Michigan, to Thelma (Scott) and Reed Beneval Resh. She graduated from the Bronson School of Nursing in 1957 and received a BA and MA from the University of Minnesota in 1967 and 1971, respectively. Thomas began her career as a freelance writer in 1972 after working as a nurse and an English teacher at the University of Minnesota.

Thomas's first book, Elizabeth Catches a Fish (1977), was based on childhood memories of fishing. Many of her other books draw on personal experience. In addition to her writing for children, Thomas wrote a column about children's literature for the Minneapolis Tribune (now the Star Tribune); as of 1982, she had written the column for a decade.

References 

1936 births
20th-century American women writers
21st-century American women writers
American children's writers
University of Minnesota alumni
People from Kalamazoo, Michigan
Living people